John Kearsley Mitchell (May 12, 1798 – April 4, 1858) was an American physician and writer, born in Shepherdstown, Virginia (present-day West Virginia). Orphaned at the age of eight, and sent to his late father's family in Scotland at the age of thirteen, Kearsley was educated at Ayr Academy and the University of Edinburgh.

He returned to the United States in 1814, and began studying medicine under Dr. Samuel Powel Griffitts (apprenticeship was a common method of medical education in this period) before enrolling at an institution for his medical education.  He graduated from the University of Pennsylvania School of Medicine in 1819. Before he went to Philadelphia to practice his profession, he made three voyages to the Far East as ship's surgeon.

In 1826 he became professor of medicine and physiology at the Philadelphia Medical Institute and in 1833 professor of chemistry at the Franklin Institute. In 1827, Mitchell was elected to the American Philosophical Society. From 1841 to 1858, he was professor of the theory and practice of medicine at Jefferson Medical College.

He was also the father of American physician and writer Silas Weir Mitchell (February 15, 1829 – January 4, 1914).

Works
 St. Helena (1821), a poem    
 On the Wisdom, Goodness and Power of God as Illustrated in the Properties of Water (1834)  
 Indecision, a Tale of the Far West, and Other Poems (1839)  
 On the Cryptogamous Origin of Malarious and Epidemic Fevers (1849)  
 Five Essays on Various Chemical and Medical Subjects (1858), published posthumously by his son S. Weir Mitchell.
 
 The Value of a Great Medical Reputation: With Suggestions for Its Attainment: A Lecture, Introductory to the Summer Course of the Medical Institute (1834),

Sources

Edgar Allan Poe Society of Baltimore
The value of a great medical reputation : with suggestions for its attainment : a lecture, introductory to the summer course of the medical institute
American Biography Online

References

1798 births
1858 deaths
American medical academics
19th-century American poets
American male poets
American science writers
American surgeons
Educators from West Virginia
Perelman School of Medicine at the University of Pennsylvania alumni
Poets from Pennsylvania
Poets from Virginia
Poets from West Virginia
Physicians from Philadelphia
People from Shepherdstown, West Virginia
Physicians from Virginia
Physicians from West Virginia
Thomas Jefferson University faculty
19th-century American male writers
19th-century American physicians
American male non-fiction writers